United States–Venezuela relations have traditionally been characterized by an important trade and investment relationship as well as cooperation in combating the production and transit of illegal drugs.

Relations with the U.S. were strong under democratic governments in Venezuela, such as those of Carlos Andrés Pérez and Rafael Caldera. However, tensions increased after President Hugo Chávez assumed elected office in 1999 and years later declared himself socialist and "anti-imperialist", in reference to being against the government of the United States. Tensions between the countries increased further after Venezuela accused the administration of George W. Bush of supporting the 2002 Venezuelan coup d'état attempt against Hugo Chávez, an accusation that was partly retracted later.

Relations between the United States and Venezuela have been further strained when the country expelled the U.S. ambassador in September 2008 in solidarity with Bolivia after a U.S. ambassador was accused of cooperating with violent anti-government groups in the country. Though relations thawed somewhat under President Barack Obama in June 2009, they steadily deteriorated once again shortly afterwards. In February 2014, the Venezuelan government ordered three American diplomats out of the country on unproved accusations of promoting violence.

During the 2019 Venezuelan presidential crisis, Nicolás Maduro announced that Venezuela was breaking ties with the United States, following President Trump's announcement that the U.S. recognized Juan Guaidó, the President of the National Assembly, as the interim President. Although the United States stopped recognizing Guaidó's presidential claim when the opposition National Assembly's vote to dissolve Guaidó's interim government took effect, the U.S. continues to recognize the 2015 National Assembly.

18th century 

As Spain became involved in the American Revolutionary War in order to expand their territories in Louisiana and Florida and to seek a recapture of Gibraltar. The Spanish Captain-General of Louisiana, Bernardo de Gálvez, in 1779 launched several offensives at Baton Rouge and Natchez, securing the way for the reconquest of Florida.

Spanish forces had begun mobilising to support their American allies, and Francisco de Miranda, who would later become a Venezuelan independence leader, was ordered to report to the Regiment of Aragon, which sailed from Cadiz in spring of 1780 under Victoriano de Navia's command. Miranda reported to his chief, General Juan Manuel Cagigal y Monserrat, in Havana, Cuba. From their headquarters in Cuba, de Cagigal and Miranda participated in the Siege of Pensacola on 9 May 1781, and Miranda was awarded the temporary title of lieutenant colonel during this action. Miranda also contributed to the French success during the Battle of the Chesapeake when he helped the Comte de Grasse raise needed funds and supplies for the battle.

19th century 
During the Spanish American wars of independence, the United States was officially neutral but permitted Spanish American agents to obtain weapons and supplies. With the reception of Manuel Torres in 1821, the Gran Colombia (present-day Panama, Colombia, Ecuador, northern Peru, Venezuela, western Guyana and northwest Brazil) became the first former Spanish colony recognized by the United States, and the United States was the second government (after the Kingdom of Brazil) to recognize an independent Spanish American state. At that time, mutual relations have existed since the U.S. established a diplomatic mission in Santa Fe de Bogota in 1823. The next year the Anderson–Gual Treaty became the first bilateral treaty the U.S. concluded with another American country. U.S. relations with the governments in Bogotá, Quito and Caracas were not interrupted when Ecuador and Venezuela left the federation in 1830.

20th century

Venezuelan crisis of 1902–1903 

The Venezuelan crisis of 1902–03 saw a naval blockade of several months imposed against Venezuela by Britain, Germany and Italy because of President Cipriano Castro's refusal to pay foreign debts and damages suffered by European citizens in a recent Venezuelan civil war. Castro assumed that the United States' Monroe Doctrine would see that the U.S. prevent European military intervention, but at the time the U.S. saw the Doctrine as concerning European seizure of territory, rather than intervention per se. President Theodore Roosevelt was concerned with the prospects of penetration into the region by Germany. With Castro failing to back down under U.S. pressure and increasingly negative British and American press reactions to the affair, the blockading nations agreed to a compromise, but maintained the blockade during negotiations over the details. This incident was a major driver of the Roosevelt Corollary and the subsequent U.S. Big Stick policy and Dollar Diplomacy in Latin America.

When American diplomat, Herbert Wolcott Bowen, returned to Venezuela in January 1904, he noticed Venezuela seemed more peaceful and secure. Castro would reassure Bowen that the United States and Venezuela were experiencing a strong relationship. However, after the Castro regime delayed fulfilling the agreements which ended the Venezuelan crisis of 1902–03, Bowen lost confidence. This would eventually lead to the Castro regime's economic policy angering the United States, France, and the Netherlands. This would play a crucial role in the Dutch–Venezuelan crisis of 1908.

Marcos Pérez Jiménez dictatorship (1953–1958) 
Dictator Marcos Pérez Jiménez overthrew the elected president, Rómulo Gallegos, and seized power in the 1948 Venezuelan coup d'état. During this prosperity, foreign investment, particularly from American oil companies, grew along with the support from the Jiménez Regime. The anti-communist regime allowed and supported the exploitation of the country's natural resources by the American oil industry, as a portion of the profits made its way from companies like Mobil and Exxon to the personal coffers of Pérez Jiménez.

Pérez Jiménez received the Legion of Merit from the U.S. government in 1954.

After the 1958 Venezuelan coup d'état, when Pérez Jiménez abandoned the government and the country on 23 January 1958, more than 400 prisoners were found in the basement of the headquarters of the Seguridad Nacional.

Democratic period 

Relations have traditionally been characterized by an important trade and investment relationship and cooperation in combating the production and transit of illegal drugs and were strong under the Puntofijo Pact governments in Venezuela, such as those of Carlos Andrés Pérez and Rafael Caldera.

21st century

Presidency of Hugo Chávez 

After Hugo Chávez was first elected President of Venezuela by a landslide in 1998, the South American country began to reassert sovereignty over its oil reserves. This action challenged the comfortable position held by U.S. economic interests for the better part of a century. The Chávez administration overturned the privatization of the state-owned oil company PDVSA, raising royalties for foreign firms and eventually doubling the country's GDP. Those oil revenues were used to fund social programs aimed at fostering human development in areas such as health, education, employment, housing, technology, culture, pensions, and access to safe drinking water.

Chávez's public friendship and significant trade relationship with Cuba and Fidel Castro undermined the U.S. policy of isolating Cuba; moreover, on Chávez's initiative, long-running ties between the U.S. and Venezuelan militaries were severed. During Venezuela's presidency of OPEC in 2000, Chávez made a ten-day tour of OPEC countries. In the process, he became the first head of state to meet Saddam Hussein since the Gulf War. The visit was controversial in the U.S., although, Chávez did respect the ban on international flights to and from Iraq as he drove from his previous stop in Iran.

According to Michal Hertik, there is no benevolent relationship between the Chávez government and United States as a great power.  Chávez is not interested in US foreign policy (actually President Bush's beliefs) including "creating a unipolar or bipolar world, effort to create a powerful empire". So he tried to break US imperialism and its interference in the affairs of foreign nation-states. Although he never tried to make South American countries agree with him.

Vargas tragedy 

During the evacuation of survivors of the Vargas tragedy, when torrential rains and the flash floods and debris flows in the Vargas State in 2000 killed tens of thousands of people and destroyed thousands of homes, a disaster relief team from the United States headed up by New Mexico State Senator Joseph Carraro arrived with a medical team and supplies to assess the damage and help those who were displaced. Contact was made with Los Alamos Laboratory in New Mexico to determine any radioactive activity included in debris field. Water purification and sleeping units were provided.

The disaster clean-up soon became politicized. Chávez initially accepted assistance from anyone who offered, with the United States sending helicopters and dozens of soldiers that arrived two days after the disaster. When defense minister Raúl Salazar complied with the offer of the United States' further aid that included 450 Marines and naval engineers aboard the USS Tortuga which was setting sail to Venezuela, Chávez told Salazar to decline the offer since "[i]t was a matter of sovereignty". Salazar became angry and assumed that Chávez's opinion was influenced by talks with Fidel Castro, though he complied with Chávez's order. Though additional aid was necessary, Chávez thought a more revolutionary image was more important and the USS Tortuga returned to its port.

United States interference allegations 
In April 2002, 19 people died in the Llaguno Overpass events in Venezuela, which resulted in Chávez' removal from power while an interim government led. The Guardian published a claim by Wayne Madsen alleging U.S. Navy involvement. U.S. Senator Christopher Dodd, D-CT, requested an investigation of concerns that Washington appeared to condone the removal of Chávez, which found that "U.S. officials acted appropriately and did nothing to encourage an April coup against Venezuela's president" nor did they provide any naval logistical support. CIA documents indicate that the Bush administration knew about a plot weeks before the April 2002 military coup. They cite a document dated 6 April 2002, which says: "dissident military factions...are stepping up efforts to organize a coup against President Chávez, possibly as early as this month." According to William Brownfield, ambassador to Venezuela, the U.S. embassy in Venezuela warned Chávez about a coup plot in April 2002. Further, the United States Department of State and the investigation by the Office of the Inspector General found no evidence that "U.S. assistance programs in Venezuela, including those funded by the National Endowment for Democracy (NED), were inconsistent with U.S. law or policy" or ". . . directly contributed, or was intended to contribute, to [the coup d'état]."

Chávez also claimed, during the coup's immediate aftermath, that the U.S. was still seeking his overthrow. On 6 October 2002, he stated that he had foiled a new coup plot, and on 20 October 2002, he stated that he had barely escaped an assassination attempt while returning from a trip to Europe. However, his administration failed to investigate or present conclusive evidence to that effect. During that period, the US Ambassador to Venezuela warned the Chávez administration of two potential assassination plots.

Venezuela expelled US naval commander, John Correa, in January 2006. The Venezuelan government claimed Correa, an attaché at the US embassy, had been collecting information from low-ranking Venezuelan military officers. Chávez claimed he had infiltrated the US embassy and found evidence of Correa's spying. The US declared these claims "baseless" and responded by expelling Jeny Figueredo, the chief aid to the Venezuelan ambassador, to the US. Chávez promoted Figueredo to Deputy Foreign Minister to Europe.

Hugo Chávez repeatedly alleged that the US had a plan, entitled Plan Balboa, to invade Venezuela. In an interview with Ted Koppel, Chávez stated "I have evidence that there are plans to invade Venezuela. Furthermore, we have documentation: how many bombers to overfly Venezuela on the day of the invasion, how many trans-Atlantic carriers, how many aircraft carriers..." Neither President Chávez nor officials of his administration ever presented such evidence. The US denied the allegations, saying that Plan Balboa was a military simulation carried out by Spain.

On 20 February 2005, Chávez reported that the U.S. had plans to have him assassinated; he stated that any such attempt would result in an immediate cessation of U.S.-bound Venezuelan petroleum shipments.

Economic relations 
Chávez's socialist ideology and the tensions between the Venezuelan and the United States governments had little impact on economic relations between the two countries. On 15 September 2005, President Bush designated Venezuela as a country that has "failed demonstrably during the previous 12 months to adhere to their obligations under international counternarcotics agreements." However, at the same time, the President waived the economic sanctions that would normally accompany such a designation, because they would have curtailed his government's assistance for democracy programs in Venezuela. In 2006, the United States remained Venezuela's most important trading partner for both oil exports and general imports – bilateral trade expanded 36% during that year As of 2007, the U.S. imported more than $40 billion in oil from Venezuela and the trade between the countries topped $50 billion despite the tumultuous relationship between the two.

With rising oil prices and Venezuela's oil exports accounting for the bulk of trade, bilateral trade between the US and Venezuela surged, with US companies and the Venezuelan government benefiting. Nonetheless, since May 2006, the Department of State, pursuant to Section 40A of the Arms Export Control Act, has prohibited the sale of defense articles and services to Venezuela because of lack of cooperation on anti-terrorism efforts.

Opposition to U.S. foreign policy 
Since the election of Hugo Chávez in 1999, relations between Venezuela and the United States deteriorated markedly, and continued to worsen after the election of George W. Bush, as Chávez became highly critical of the U.S. economic and foreign policy. Moreover, he criticized U.S. policy with regards to Iraq, Haiti, Kosovo the Free Trade Area of the Americas, and other areas. Chávez also denounced the U.S.-backed ouster of Haitian President Jean-Bertrand Aristide in February 2004. In a speech at the United Nations General Assembly, Chávez said that Bush promoted "a false democracy of the elite" and a "democracy of bombs."

Chávez's public friendship and significant trade relationship with Cuba and Fidel Castro undermined the U.S. policy of isolating Cuba; moreover, on Chávez's initiative, long-running ties between the U.S. and Venezuelan militaries were also severed. Chávez's stance as an OPEC price hawk has also raised the price of petroleum for American consumers, as Venezuela pushed OPEC producers towards lower production ceilings, with the resultant price settling around $25 a barrel prior to 2004. During Venezuela's holding of the OPEC presidency in 2000, Chávez made a ten-day tour of OPEC countries. In the process, he became the first head of state to meet Saddam Hussein since the Gulf War. The visit was controversial both in Venezuela and in the US, although Chávez did respect the ban on international flights to and from Iraq (he drove from Iran, his previous stop).

The Bush administration consistently opposed Chávez's policies. Although it did not immediately recognize the Carmona government upon its installation during the 2002 attempted coup, it had funded groups behind the coup, speedily acknowledged the new government and seemed to hope it would last. The U.S. government called Chávez a "negative force" in the region, and sought support from among Venezuela's neighbors to isolate Chávez diplomatically and economically. One notable instance occurred at the 2005 meeting of the Organization of American States. A U.S. resolution to add a mechanism to monitor the nature of American democracies was widely seen as an attempt at diplomatically isolating both Chávez and the Venezuelan government. The failure of the resolution was seen by analysts as politically significant, evidencing widespread support in Latin America for Chávez, his policies, and his views.

The U.S. also opposed and lobbied against numerous Venezuelan arms purchases made under Chávez. This includes a purchase of some 100,000 rifles from Russia, which Donald Rumsfeld implied would be passed on to the Revolutionary Armed Forces of Colombia (FARC), and the purchase of aircraft from Brazil. The U.S. has also warned Israel to not carry through on a deal to upgrade Venezuela's aging fleet of F-16s. In August 2005, Chávez rescinded the rights of U.S. Drug Enforcement Administration (DEA) agents to operate in Venezuelan territory, territorial airspace, and territorial waters. While U.S. State Department officials stated that the DEA agents' presence was intended to stem cocaine traffic from Colombia, Chávez argued that there was reason to believe the DEA agents were gathering intelligence for a clandestine assassination targeting him, with the ultimate aim of ending the Bolivarian Revolution.

When a Marxist insurgency picked up speed in Colombia in the early 2000s, Chávez chose not to support the U.S. in its backing of the Colombian government. Instead, Chávez declared Venezuela to be neutral in the dispute, yet another action that irritated American officials and tensed up relations between the two nations. The border between Venezuela and Colombia was one of the most dangerous borders in Latin America at the time, because of Colombia's war spilling over to Venezuela.

Chávez dared the U.S. on 14 March 2008 to put Venezuela on a list of countries accused of supporting terrorism, calling it one more attempt by Washington, D.C. to undermine him for political reasons.

In May 2011, Venezuela was one of the few countries to condemn the killing of Osama Bin Laden. Vice President Elias Jaua said: "It surprises me to no end how natural crime and murder [have] become, how [they are] celebrated". He added: "At least before imperial governments were more subtle." Jaua elaborated this, stating that now the deaths, both of people working outside the law and of families of presidents (an apparent reference to Saif al-Arab Gaddafi, a target of the 2011 Libyan civil war who had been killed the day prior to bin Laden's death) "are openly celebrated by the leaders of the nations that bomb them."

Personal disputes 
Chávez's anti-U.S. rhetoric sometimes touched the personal: in response to the ouster of Haitian President Jean-Bertrand Aristide in February 2004, Chávez called U.S. President George W. Bush a pendejo ("jerk" or "dumbass"); in a later speech, he made similar remarks regarding Condoleezza Rice. President Barack Obama called Chávez "a force that has interrupted progress in the region". In a 2006 speech at the UN he referred to Bush as "the Devil" while speaking at the same podium the US president had used the previous day claiming that "it still smells of sulphur". He later commented that Barack Obama "shared the same stench".

During his weekly address Aló Presidente of 18 March 2006, Chávez responded to a White House report which characterized him as a "demagogue who uses Venezuela's oil wealth to destabilize democracy in the region". During the address Chávez rhetorically called George W. Bush "a donkey." He repeated it several times adding "eres un cobarde ... eres un asesino, un genocida ... eres un borracho" (you are a coward ... you are an assassin, a mass-murderer ... you are a drunk). Chávez said Bush was "a sick man" and "an alcoholic".

Relations with Cuba and Iran 
Chávez's warm friendship with former Cuban President Fidel Castro, in addition to Venezuela's significant and expanding economic, social, and aid relationships with Cuba, undermined the U.S. policy objective seeking to isolate the island. In 2000 Venezuela stepped in to bolster the Cuban crisis arising from the fall of the Soviet Union. Venezuela agreed to provide Cuba with a third of its oil needs, at a 40% discount supplemented by a subsidized loan, the value of which was estimated at $1.5-billion per year. In return, Cuba was to deliver doctors to work in Venezuela. The Venezuela assistance to the Cuban economy was estimated at between $10 billion to $13 billion annually between 2010 and 2013.

Chávez consolidated diplomatic relations with Iran, including defending its right to civilian nuclear power. Venezuela severed diplomatic relations with Israel in January 2009.

Organization of American States 
At the 2005 meeting of the Organization of American States, a United States resolution to add a mechanism to monitor the nature of democracies was widely seen as a move to isolate Venezuela. The failure of the resolution was seen as politically significant, expressing Latin American support for Chávez.

Hurricane Katrina 
After Hurricane Katrina battered the United States' Gulf coast in late 2005, the Chávez administration offered aid to the region. According to activist Jesse Jackson, the Bush administration declined the Venezuelan offer. However, United States Ambassador to Venezuela, William Brownfield welcomed the offer of fuel assistance to the region, calling it "a generous offer" and saying "when we are talking about one-to-five million dollars, that is real money. I want to recognize that and say, 'thank you.'"

In November 2005, following negotiations by leading US politicians for the US' largest fuel distributors to offer discounts to the less well-off, officials in Massachusetts signed an agreement with Venezuela. The agreement aims to provide heating oil at a 40% discount to low-income families through Citgo, a subsidiary of PDVSA and the only company to respond to the politicians' request. Chávez stated that such gestures comprise "a strong oil card to play on the geopolitical stage" and that "it is a card that we are going to play with toughness against the toughest country in the world, the United States."

U.S. administrations 
In September 2008, following retaliatory measures in support of Bolivia, Chávez expelled the U.S. ambassador Patrick Duddy. Chávez labeled Duddy persona non-grata after accusing him of aiding a conspiracy against his government – a charge Duddy consequently denied.

Despite allegedly waning of Hugo Chávez's aggressive foreign policy due to the sharp drop in oil in the last quarter of 2008, hostility with America continued. "American Corners," (AC) a partnership between the Public Affairs sections of U.S. Embassies worldwide and their host institutions, was said to be an interference in Venezuela. In their book, Imperial Spiderweb: Encyclopedia of Interference and Subversion, Eva Golinger and Frenchman, Riman Mingus, warned that it was one of Washington's secret forms of propaganda, Golinger denouncing AC to the Venezuelan National Assembly as virtual consulates, which are not formally sponsored by the US government, but by an organization, association, school, library or local institution. Additionally, they have not only functioned as a launch pad for a psychological war, but also sought to subvert and violate diplomatic rules. The AC's were alleged to be closely supervised by the State Department. Golinger has been described by many as pro-Chávez.

In January 2009, Chávez announced an investigation into the US Chargé d'Affairs, John Caulfield, who is the leading US diplomat after Duddy's expulsion. He contended that Caulfield had possibly met with opposition Venezuelans in exile in Puerto Rico; an official spokeswoman from the United States said Caulfield was there for a wedding. Chávez used the occasion to accuse "the empire" of using Puerto Rico as a base for actions against him and Latin America. He referred to Puerto Rico as a "gringo colony" and that one day the island would be liberated.

Presidency of Barack Obama 
During the 2008 U.S. election, Chávez declared that he had no preference between Barack Obama and John McCain stating "the two candidates for the US presidency attack us equally, they attack us defending the interests of the empire". After Obama had won the election, Venezuela's foreign minister labeled the outcome an historic moment in international relations and added that the American people had chosen a "new brand" of diplomacy. When Chávez was asked if the previously expelled ambassadors for each country would return, he replied "everything has its time." However, at a rally the evening before the 4 November elections where Chávez was supporting his own candidates Chávez echoed a sentiment by Lula of Brazil and Morales of Bolivia, referencing the change happening in Latin America seemed to be taking place in the US. He expressed hope that he would meet with Obama as soon as possible. However, on 22 March 2009, Chávez called Obama "ignorant" and claimed Obama "has the same stench as Bush", after the US accused Venezuela of supporting the insurgent Revolutionary Armed Forces of Colombia (FARC). Chávez was offended after Obama said that he had "been a force that has interrupted progress in the region", resulting in his decision to put Venezuela's new ambassador to the United States on hold.

During the Summit of the Americas on 17 April 2009, Chávez met with Obama for the first, and only, time where he expressed his wish to become Obama's friend.

On 20 December 2011, Chávez called Obama "A clown, an embarrassment, and a shame to Black People" after Obama criticized Venezuela's ties with Iran and Cuba.

Venezuela and the United States have not had ambassadors in each other's capitals since 2010. Shortly before the 2012 US presidential elections, Chávez announced that if he could vote in the election, he would vote for Obama. In 2013, before Chávez died, Venezuelan Vice President Nicolás Maduro expelled two U.S. military attaches from the country, saying they were plotting against Venezuela by attempting to recruit Venezuelan military personnel to destabilize Venezuela and suggested they caused Chávez's cancer. The Obama Administration rejected the allegations and responded by expelling two Venezuelan diplomats.

President Barack Obama signed the Venezuela Defense of Human Rights and Civil Society Act of 2014, a U.S. act imposing sanctions on Venezuelan individuals held responsible by the United States for human rights violations during the 2014 Venezuelan protests, in December of that year. It "requires the President to impose sanctions" on those "responsible for significant acts of violence or serious human rights abuses associated with February 2014 protests or, more broadly, against anyone who has directed or ordered the arrest or prosecution of a person primarily because of the person's legitimate exercise of freedom of expression or assembly". The act was extended in 2016 to expire on 31 December 2019.

On 2 February 2015, the United States Department of State imposed visa restrictions on current and former Venezuelan officials that were allegedly linked to presumed human rights abuses and political corruption. The visa restrictions also included family members, with the Department of State saying, "We are sending a clear message that human rights abusers, those who profit from public corruption, and their families are not welcome in the United States".

Obama issued Executive Order 13692 in March 2015, which blocks assets or imposes travel bans on those "involved in or responsible for the erosion of human rights guarantees, persecution of political opponents, curtailment of press freedoms, use of violence and human rights violations and abuses in response to antigovernment protests, and arbitrary arrest and detention of antigovernment protestors, as well as significant public corruption by senior government officials in the country." Under EO 13692, the Obama administration sanctioned seven individuals, and the Trump administration has sanctioned 73 as of 8 March 2019.

In December 2011, Chávez, already under treatment for cancer, wondered out loud: "would it be so strange that they’ve invented the technology to spread cancer and we won't know about it for 50 years?" The Venezuelan president was speaking one day after Argentina's leftist president, Cristina Fernández de Kirchner, announced she had been diagnosed with thyroid cancer. This was after three other prominent leftist Latin America leaders had been diagnosed with cancer: Brazil's president, Dilma Rousseff; former Paraguayan president, Fernando Lugo, and the former Brazilian leader, Luiz Inácio Lula da Silva. The Guardian newspaper's Venezuela expert, Rory Carroll, has glibly categorized serious charges that Chávez was assassinated by a United States-produced bio-weapon as being in the same league with "conspiracy theorists who wonder about aliens at Roswell and NASA faking the moon landings". A number of Venezuelan officials believe a hostile party covertly introduced an aggressive form of cancer into the 58-year-old president.

Presidency of Donald Trump 
The Trump administration's foreign policy regarding Venezuela was aimed at supporting Guaidó and isolating Maduro. They used these methods to achieve their goals:"sanctions and visa revocations on Maduro government officials and their families, broader sanctions on the economy and government".

When the UN General Assembly voted to add Venezuela to the UN Human Rights Council in October 2019, US Ambassador to the United Nations Kelly Craft wrote: "I am personally aggrieved that 105 countries voted in favor of this affront to human life and dignity. It provides ironclad proof that the Human Rights Council is broken, and reinforces why the United States withdrew." Venezuela had been accused of withholding from the Venezuelan people humanitarian aid delivered from other nations, and of manipulating its voters in exchange for food and medical care. The council had been criticized regularly for admitting members who were themselves suspected of human rights violations.

In January 2019, the possibility of U.S. military intervention in Venezuela was proposed by President Trump and other officials. U.S. allies and Members of Congress disagreed with the proposal of intervention. So the Trump Administration applied other alternatives to put Maduro under pressure.

President Donald Trump was hostile to the Maduro government. In 2020 the U.S. indicted Maduro and several other high government officials on narco-terrorism charges, offering a US$15 million reward for his capture.

In May 2020, Two Americans, both former U.S. special forces soldiers were among the mercenaries captured during an unsuccessful invasion in Macuto, Venezuela.

Halliburton, an American oil services company, was forced to cease operations in Venezuela in December 2020.

Six American oil company representatives held in prison since 2017, known as the Citgo Six, were convicted of corruption in November 2021.

On the last full day of his presidency, 19 January 2021, Donald Trump protected 145,000 Venezuelan citizens living in the U.S. from deportation for 18 months.

Presidency of Joe Biden 
On 9 March 2021, President Joe Biden granted temporary protected status (TPS) to Venezuelan immigrants in the United States.

On 5 March 2022, the U.S. sent a special envoy to Caracas for a rare face-to-face meeting with the Maduro government. On the agenda was the fate of six employees of PDVSA's Houston-based subsidiary Citgo, and three imprisoned U.S. servicemen. The plan by the Biden Administration is to replace Russian oil with direct deliveries from Venezuela. According to the U.S. Energy Information Administration, the projected loss of oil imports from Russia due to sanctions in response to the invasion of Ukraine would be slightly below the amount Venezuela exported to the U.S. in 2018.

On March 9, 2022, one of the Citgo Six was released following a meeting between US officials, including US Ambassador to Venezuela James B. Story, and Venezuelan President Nicolás Maduro. On October 1, 2022, the remaining five members of the Citgo Six were released following a prisoner exchange.

Presidency of Nicolás Maduro 

On 1 October 2013, the US ordered three Venezuelan diplomats out of the country in response to the Venezuelan government's decision to expel three US officials from Venezuela.

On 16 February 2014, President Maduro announced he had ordered another three US consular officials to leave the country, accusing them of conspiring against the government and aiding opposition protests. Maduro described the US statements that claimed to be concerned with rising tensions and protests and warned against Venezuela's possible arrest of the country's opposition leader as "unacceptable" and "insolent." He said, "I don't take orders from anyone in the world." On 25 February 2014, the United States responded by expelling three additional Venezuelan diplomats from the country.

On 28 May 2014, the United States House of Representatives passed the Venezuelan Human Rights and Democracy Protection Act (H.R. 4587; 113th Congress), a bill that would apply economic sanctions against Venezuelan officials who were involved in the mistreatment of protestors during the 2014 Venezuelan protests.

In December 2014, the US Congress passed Senate 2142 (the "Venezuela Defense of Human Rights and Civil Society Act of 2014").

On 9 March 2015, the United States President, Barack Obama, signed and issued a presidential order declaring Venezuela a "threat to its national security" and ordered sanctions against seven Venezuelan officials. Venezuelan President Nicolás Maduro denounced the sanctions as an attempt to topple his socialist government. Washington said that the sanctions targeted individuals who were involved in the violation of Venezuelans' human rights, saying that "we are deeply concerned by the Venezuelan government's efforts to escalate intimidation of its political opponents".

The sanctions were denounced by other Latin American countries. The Community of Latin American and Caribbean States issued a statement criticizing Washington's "unilateral coercive measures against International Law." The Secretary-General of the Union of South American Nations (UNASUR), Ernesto Samper, said that the body rejects "any attempt at internal or external interference that attempts to disrupt the democratic process in Venezuela."

Following the election of Donald Trump as President of the United States, Citgo, a US-based oil company owned by the Venezuelan government, gifted $500,000 toward Donald Trump's inauguration on 20 January 2017.

On 20 April 2017, the Venezuelan Government seized the General Motors plant in the Venezuelan state of Zulia, causing the plant to close operations.

Between 2014 and 2020, United States sanctions against Venezuela are estimated to have caused the deaths of 100,000 people due to the difficulty of importing medicine and health care equipment, according to academic Helen Yaffe.

2017 Venezuelan constitutional crisis 

On 11 August 2017, President Trump said that he is "not going to rule out a military option" to confront the autocratic government of Nicolás Maduro and the deepening crisis in Venezuela. Venezuela's Defense Minister, Vladimir Padrino López, immediately criticized Trump for his statement, calling it "an act of supreme extremism" and "an act of madness." The Venezuelan Communications Minister, Ernesto Villegas, said Trump's words amounted to "an unprecedented threat to national sovereignty". President Maduro's son, Nicolás Maduro Guerra, stated during the 5th Constituent Assembly of Venezuela session that if the United States were to attack Venezuela, "the rifles would arrive in New York, Mr. Trump, we would arrive and take the White House."

2019 Venezuelan presidential crisis and rapprochement 

On 23 January 2019, Maduro announced that Venezuela was breaking ties with the United States following President Trump's announcement of recognizing Juan Guaidó, the leader of Venezuela's National Assembly, as the interim President of Venezuela. Maduro said all US diplomats must leave within 72 hours, but Guaidó said that they should stay. Maduro later confirmed the closure of the Venezuelan Embassy and all consulates in the United States. In response Maduro ordered the expulsion of US diplomats, giving them 72 hours to leave Venezuela. The US said it would not close its embassy, stating their diplomatic relationship was with Guaidó's government, and holding Maduro responsible for the safety of its staff. On 26 January 2019, only hours before the deadline, the Maduro government backtracked on its expulsion order, giving US diplomats another 30 days.

The last U.S. diplomats in Caracas left Venezuela on Thursday, 14 March, according to Secretary of State Mike Pompeo. Their departure put an end to a U.S. presence in Venezuela, after president Maduro effectively broke off diplomatic relations with the U.S. in late January.

On 5 April 2019, the United States signed a protecting power agreement with Switzerland to represent its interests in Venezuela, however, the agreement is not yet operational as it has not been approved by Maduro's government due to the United States rejecting Maduro's government's proposal to have Turkey as its protecting power as the United States only recognizes Guaidó as interim president. In the meantime, the United States has instead established a "Venezuela Affairs Unit" section at the U.S. Embassy in Bogota, Colombia to serves as an interim diplomatic office to Venezuela.

In the spring of 2020 the United States stepped up pressure on Maduro. On 26 March the United States accused President Nicolás Maduro of narcoterrorism and offered a $15 million reward for information leading to his arrest. In response, Maduro called US President Donald Trump a "racist cowboy". A few days later, Venezuelan Attorney General Tarek William Saab summoned opposition leader Juan Guaidó for questioning for an alleged "attempted coup d'etat" and "attempted assassination". On 31 March, United States Secretary of State Mike Pompeo said that sanctions did not apply to humanitarian aid during the health emergency and that the United States would lift its sanctions if Maduro agreed to organize elections that did not include Maduro in a period of six to twelve months and reiterated U.S. support for Guaidó. Then on 1 April President Trump announced that he was sending anti-drug Navy ships and AWACS planes to the region near Venezuela in one of the largest military build-ups in the region since the 1989 invasion of Panama to remove General Manuel Noriega from power.

In March 2022, the U.S. and Venezuela had a gradual rapprochement as they began easing sanctions on Venezuelan oil as it was impacted due to Russia's illegal invasion of Ukraine that began a month prior. Later, in December 2022, the interim government which was recognized by the United States was dissolved. Despite the dissolution, the U.S. Government continued to recognize the 2015 National Assembly. Days after the government has dissolved, the Venezuelan embassy which was run by the interim government suspended its operations.

Public opinion
Despite the continually strained ties between the two governments, 82% of Venezuelans viewed the U.S. positively in 2002, though this view declined down to 62% in 2014 (per the Pew Research Global Attitudes Project). The Gallup Global Leadership Report indicates that as of 2013, 35% of Venezuelans approve of United States' global leadership, and 35% disapprove. The Spring 2017 Global Attitudes Survey by Pew Research Center found that 47% of the Venezuelan population views the United States favorably and 35% view it unfavorable."

SICOFAA
In 1960, the UNITAS naval exercises and in-port training involving several countries in North, South and Central America were conducted for the first time in Venezuelan territorial waters in support of the Cold War U.S. policy. Venezuela is an active member of SICOFAA.

See also 

United States and South and Central America
United States–Venezuela Maritime Boundary Treaty
Latin America–United States relations
Venezuelan Americans

Notes

Further reading
 Bonomi, Victor, and Po-Lin Pan. "Framing of the US-Venezuela diplomatic relationship in major US newspapers." Journal of International Communication 19.2 (2013): 235–251.
 Carroll, Rory. Comandante: Hugo Chávez's Venezuela (Penguin Books, 2014).
  Ewell, Judith. Venezuela and the United States: From Monroe's Hemisphere to Petroleum's Empire (University of Georgia Press, 1996)
 Jacobs, Matthew D. "Reformists, revolutionaries, and Kennedy administration public diplomacy in Colombia and Venezuela." Diplomatic History 42.5 (2018): 859–885.
 Painter, David S. "Oil and the American century." Journal of American History 99.1 (2012): 24–39. online
 Rabe, Stephen G. The road to OPEC: United States relations with Venezuela, 1919-1976 (University of Texas Press, 2011)
 
 Salas, Miguel Tinker. "Staying the course: United States oil companies in Venezuela, 1945–1958." Latin American Perspectives 32.2 (2005): 147–170.
 Salas, Miguel Tinker. "US oil companies in Venezuela: The forging of an enduring alliance." in Venezuela: Hugo Chávez and the Decline of an 'exceptional Democracy'  (2006): 35+.
 Salas, Miguel Tinker. Venezuela: What Everyone Needs to Know (Oxford University Press, 2015) online.

 Singh, Kelvin. "Oil Politics in Venezuela During the López Contreras Administration (1936–1941)." Journal of Latin American Studies 21.1-2 (1989): 89–104.
 Tsvetkova, Natalia, et al. "Venezuela in US public diplomacy, 1950s–2000s: The Cold War, democratization, and the digitalization of politics." Cogent Social Sciences 5.1 (2019): 1693109. online

External links
 History of Venezuela – U.S. relations
 U.S. Arms Sales to Venezuela from the Dean Peter Krogh Foreign Affairs Digital Archives

 
Venezuela
Bilateral relations of Venezuela